Michael Arthur Findlay (1944 – 7 December 2014) was a Scottish veterinary surgeon, author and broadcaster.

Early life
Findlay was born in Ayr, Scotland.  He was educated at Strathallan School and the University of Glasgow.  Findlay graduated from the Glasgow Veterinary College in 1966 having read veterinary science.

Career
Upon qualifying Findlay became an assistant vet with Henderson and Keywood in Surbiton, London.  He then bought his own practice in Putney.  However, he did not enjoy the administrative side of the business and turned to locum work.

In 1984 he joined Ciba-Geigy Pharmaceuticals as public affairs advisor.  Thereafter, a freelance public relations advisor in 1993.  He became one of the main architects of the National Vocational Qualification scheme for those caring for animals, helping to devise the course standards and materials.  Latterly, he was chief executive of the PRO Dogs charity.

In the early 1980s he was the regular vet on the BBC One children's tv programme "Saturday Superstore".  He was also a regular broadcaster appearing on Jimmy Youngs radio show, LBC and Capital Radio.

Findlay was a member of the Governing Council of the Cat Fancy (GCCF) Veterinary Sub-committee (now Veterinary Advisory Committee) for 46 years.  He was a duty vet and had officiated at GCCF shows for as many years.  Findlay was also vice-president of the London Cat Club and a member of The Kennel Club.

Publications

References

External links

1944 births
2014 deaths
People from Ayr
People educated at Strathallan School
Alumni of the University of Glasgow
Scottish broadcasters
Scottish veterinarians
Animal care and training writers